The 2018 Campeonato Brasileiro Série B was a football competition held in Brazil, equivalent to the second division.

Twenty teams competed in the tournament, twelve returning from the 2017 season, four promoted from the 2017 Campeonato Brasileiro Série C (CSA, Fortaleza, São Bento and Sampaio Corrêa). and four relegated from the 2017 Campeonato Brasileiro Série A (Coritiba, Avaí, Ponte Preta and Atlético Goianiense).

The top four teams were promoted to the 2019 Campeonato Brasileiro Série A. Fortaleza became the first club to be promoted after a 1–2 win against Atlético Goianiense on 3 November 2018. Goiás was promoted on 17 November, and Avaí and CSA on 24 November.

Teams

Number of teams by state

Venues

Personnel and kits

Managerial changes

League table

Results

Top scorers

References 

Campeonato Brasileiro Série B seasons
2